The 2005 Richard Luton Properties Canberra Women's Classic was a tennis tournament played on outdoor hard courts. It was the 5th edition of the Canberra International, and part of the WTA Tier V tournaments of the 2005 WTA Tour. It took place at the National Sports Club in Canberra, Australia, from 10 to 16 January 2005.

Singles main-draw entrants

Seeds

 1 Rankings are as of 27 December 2004

Other entrants 

The following players received wildcards into the singles main draw:
  Monique Adamczak
  Lauren Breadmore

The following players received entry from the qualifying draw:
  Ekaterina Bychkova
  Evie Dominikovic
  Ana Ivanovic
  Lenka Němečková

The following player received entry as a lucky loser:
  Melinda Czink

Withdrawals 
Before the tournament
  Katarina Srebotnik → replaced by Melinda Czink

Doubles main-draw entrants

Seeds

 1 Rankings are as of 27 December 2004

Other entrants 

The following pair received a wildcard into the doubles main draw:
  Monique Adamczak /  Nicole Kriz

The following pair received entry from the qualifying draw:
  Yuliya Beygelzimer /  Sandra Klösel

The following pair received entry as lucky losers:
  Adriana Barna /  Anca Barna

Withdrawals 
Before the tournament
  Émilie Loit /  Claudine Schaul → replaced by Adriana Barna / Anca Barna

During the tournament
  Marion Bartoli /  Anna-Lena Grönefeld

Champions

Singles

 Ana Ivanovic defeated  Melinda Czink, 7–5, 6–1

Doubles

 Tathiana Garbin /  Tina Križan defeated  Gabriela Navrátilová /  Michaela Paštiková, 7–5, 1–6, 6–4

References

External links
 Official Results Archive (ITF)
 Official Results Archive (WTA)

 
Richard Luton Properties Canberra Women's Classic
Richard Luton Properties Canberra Women's Classic
Richard Luton Properties Canberra Women's Classic